Operation Babylift was the name given to the mass evacuation of children from South Vietnam to the United States and other western countries (including Australia, France, West Germany, and Canada) at the end of the Vietnam War (see also the Fall of Saigon), on April 3–26, 1975.  By the final American flight out of South Vietnam, over 3,300 infants and children had been airlifted, although the actual number has been variously reported.  Along with Operation New Life, over 110,000 refugees were evacuated from South Vietnam at the end of the Vietnam War. Thousands of children were airlifted from Vietnam and adopted by families around the world.

Overview 

With the central Vietnamese city of Da Nang having fallen in March, and with Saigon under attack and being shelled, on April 3, 1975, U.S. President Gerald Ford announced that the U.S. government would begin airlifting orphans out of Saigon on a series of 30 planned flights aboard Military Airlift Command (MAC) C-5A Galaxy and C-141 Starlifter cargo aircraft operated by 62nd Airlift Wing of the United States Air Force under the command of Major General Edward J. Nash.

Adoption agency Holt International as well as service organizations including Friends of Children of Viet Nam (FCVN), Friends For All Children (FFAC), Catholic Relief Service, International Social Services, International Orphans and the Pearl S. Buck Foundation petitioned the government to help evacuate the various orphans in their facilities in Vietnam. In their book, Silence Broken, Childhelp (International Orphans at the time) founders Sara O'Meara and Yvonne Fedderson chronicle their request from Lieutenant General Lewis William Walt to help with evacuations and finding homes for the Asian-American orphans.

Flights continued until artillery attacks by North Vietnamese Army and Viet Cong military units on Tan Son Nhut Airport rendered airplane flights impossible.

Over 2,500 children were relocated without their consent and adopted out to families in the United States and its allies. The operation was controversial because there was question about whether the evacuation was in the children's best interest, and because  not all the children were orphans.

When American businessman Robert Macauley learned that it would take more than a week to evacuate the surviving orphans due to the lack of military transport planes, he chartered a Boeing 747 from World Airways and arranged for 300 orphaned children to leave the country, paying for the trip by mortgaging his house.

Frederick M. "Skip" Burkle Jr. served as the medical director of Operation Babylift. He gathered the orphans in Saigon, accompanied them to Clark AB (Air Base) in the Philippines, and continued to care for them on the Boeing 747 across the Pacific Ocean to Los Angeles and then Long Beach Naval Support Activity.

Plane crash 

A C-5A Galaxy, serial number 68-0218, flew the initial mission of Operation Babylift departing from Tan Son Nhut Airport shortly after 4 p.m. on April 4, 1975.  Twelve minutes after takeoff, there was what seemed to be an explosion as the lower rear fuselage was torn apart.  The locks of the rear loading ramp had failed, causing the door to open and separate.  A rapid decompression occurred.  Control and trim cables to the rudder and elevators were severed, leaving only one aileron and wing spoilers operating.  Two of the four hydraulic systems were out.  The crew wrestled at the controls, managing to keep control of the plane with changes in power settings by using the one working aileron and wing spoilers.  The crew descended to an altitude of 4,000 feet on a heading of 310 degrees in preparation for landing on Tan Son Nhut's runway 25L.  About halfway through a turn to final approach, the rate of descent increased rapidly.  Seeing they couldn't make the runway, full power was applied to bring the nose up.  The C-5 touched down in a rice paddy.  Skidding for a quarter of a mile, the aircraft became airborne again for a half mile before hitting a dike and breaking into four parts, some of which caught fire.  According to DIA figures, 176 people survived and 138 people were killed in the crash, including 78 children and 35 Defense Attaché Office, Saigon personnel.

Legacy 

The Vietnamese adoptee-run nonprofit, Operation Reunite, is using DNA testing to match adoptees with their Vietnamese families.

A memorial was unveiled in Holmdel, New Jersey, US in April 2015.

See also
 Friends For All Children
 Childhelp
 Operation Peter Pan

References

Further reading
 Anderson, Wanni Wibulswasdi; Lee, Robert G., Displacements and Diasporas: Asians in the Americas, Rutgers University Press, 2005. 
 Bass, Thomas A., Vietnamerica: The War Comes Home, Soho Press, Incorporated, 1997. 
 Emerson, Gloria, Winners and Losers: Battles, Retreats, Gains, Losses, and Ruins from a Long War, Random House, 1976. 
 Gronewold, Sue, Operation Babylift Through Film: Suggestions for Classroom Use of "Precious Cargo" and "Daughter from Danang" - Expanding East Asian Studies (ExEAS) program, Weatherhead East Asian Institute, Columbia University
 Herrington, Stuart A. Peace with Honor? An American Reports on Vietnam 1973-75, Presidio Press (1983). For an account of the day of the plane crash, see pp. 137–140.
 Williams, Indigo, Not Quite/Just The Same/Different: The Construction of Identity In Vietnamese War Orphans Adopted By White Parents, Master of Arts by Thesis. Faculty of Humanities and Social Sciences, University of Technology, Sydney. 2003

Media references 
 Operation Babylift: The Lost Children of Vietnam is a documentary released in 2009 about the adoptees and volunteers as they examine their lives and the effects of this historic mission on their lives nearly 35 years later.
 Daughter from Đà Nẵng is a 2002 documentary film about an Amerasian woman who returns to visit her biological family in Đà Nẵng, Vietnam after 22 years of separation and living in the United States, having been taken out of Vietnam as a child in Operation Babylift.
 Precious Cargo - a 2001 documentary film on Operation Babylift and the return of eight adoptees twenty five years later
 "Operation Babylift: The case of the disappearing orphans," by Helen Jacobus. Cover story of the New Statesman (London), May 11, 1984. pages 8–10; and follow-up story, "Mother Courage of Vietnam finds son in UK," by Jane Thomas, New Statesman, July 20, 1984, page 4.

External links 
 Operation Babylift from The Gerald R. Ford Presidential Digital Library.
 A website including several articles about Operation Babylift
 Vietnam Babylift website
 Page 6 has article written by the pilot of the Babylift plane crash
 Adopted Vietnamese International (AVI), based in Australia, has info on Babylift, particularly on where are the Australian adopted Vietnamese children today. Site managed and maintained by adopted Vietnamese.
 Vietnamese Adoptee Network (VAN), based in the USA. Site managed and maintained by adopted Vietnamese
 Vietnam Adoption Blog article about President Ford receiving Babylift Award of Special Recognition
 "Operation Babylift: The Lost Children of Vietnam" documentary about the experiences of the adoptees raised in America.
 Operation Babylift Articles and Photos

1975 in military history
Adoption history
Vietnamese refugees
1975 in Vietnam
Evacuations
Babylift
Babylift
Babylift
History of immigration to the United States
History of South Vietnam
Airlifts
Presidency of Gerald Ford
1975 in Canada
1975 in Australia
1975 in France
1975 in the United States